Tony Oakey (born 2 January 1976) is a British former professional boxer who competed from 1998 to 2010. He held the Commonwealth light heavyweight title in 2001 and the British light heavyweight title from 2007 to 2008.

On Friday 20 February 2009 Tony won the Prizefighter Contest winning £25,000 after scoring wins over Billy Boyle, Courtney Fry and Darren Stubbs.

Professional boxing record

References

1976 births
Living people
Sportspeople from Portsmouth
English male boxers
Prizefighter contestants
Light-heavyweight boxers